Macourek is a Czech surname. Notable people with the surname include:

Miloš Macourek (1926–2002), Czech poet, playwright, author, and screenwriter
Béla Macourek (1889–?), World War I Czech flying ace

Czech-language surnames